Momba Station is a pastoral lease that operates as a sheep station in New South Wales.

History
Momba Station on the Paroo River and the Darling River was established by the brothers Edward and Frederic Bonney. Frederic arrived in 1865 to join his brother after both of them had been attracted to the country by their uncle, Charles Bonney. Frederic Bonney sold the station and went back to the United Kingdom in 1881 due to his brother's poor health. Bonney however recorded some important anthropology through his writing and his enthusiasm for photography. Some of his original images were lost, but his work has been published in two books and they include photographs of the Paakantyi. These were the Aboriginal people who lived near the Paroo river who became labourers on the station.

Charles Dickens' son, Plorn, was withdrawn from school and he was at Momba Station a few days before his sixteenth birthday in 1868. He worked as a stockman at Momba in the late 1860s to 1872 when he established Yanda Station.

By 1883 the owners had spent £102,080 on improvements at both Momba and Mount Murchison. It was owned by the Momba Pastoral Company, the principals of which later formed Elders.

From 1902 Momba was successively subdivided. Peter Waite owned the property in 1906 when he and other pastoralists in the area formed the Pastoralists' Association of West Darling.

It was most likely purchased by Joseph Timms who owned the property in 1917. Timms disposed of 100,000 sheep to Ben Chaffey of Moorna Station. Later the same year, Timms sold of a  portion of the station to Messrs King and Allison of Wilcannia.

In 1924 the station was put up for auction by Timms and Sidney Kidman as part of an aggregation of over 1.4 million acres.

Struck by drought in 1927, the property had been carrying 9,000 head of cattle but only 2,000 were expected to survive.

In 1950 the remainder of the property was divided into ten leases including Peery, Mandalay and Arrowbar.

The station today
Tom Brinkworth acquired Momba at some point prior to 2006. He also owns the  Duntroon, the adjacent property Mena Murtee, Goorimpa on the Paroo, Ulalie and Bon View Stations. Since then the Brinkworth family has also acquired the properties Kalkaroo, Annalara, Wild Duck, Tillenbury, Purnawilla, Bimpero and Gumbalara to add to the Watervalley Pty Ltd portfolio of Western NSW holdings

See also

List of ranches and stations

References

Pastoral leases in New South Wales
Stations (Australian agriculture)